Paolo Antonio Testore (born 1700 - died 1767) was a Milanese luthier. He was born in Milan, the second son of Carlo Giuseppe Testore, also a noted luthier, and worked out of the family's workshop under the "Sign of the Eagle" on Contrada Larga in Milan. He was one of the three finest instrument-makers from the Testore family, but a distinctive characteristic of Paolo Antonio's work is that he often omitted purfling and sometimes used lower quality wood.

Testore's brother Carlo Antonio Testore was also a luthier, and their sons Giovanni, son of Carlo, and Gennaro(?), son of Paolo, continued the family business in Milan during the 1760s.

References

1700 births
1767 deaths
Italian luthiers
Businesspeople from Milan